Best Ever Food Review Show (BEFRS) is a YouTube food and travel channel created by American filmmaker Will Sonbuchner (born August 22, 1984), alias, Sonny Side. The production team is based in Vietnam with episodes being filmed globally. The show won the 2020 Webby Award for "People's Voice: Viral Video of The Year" and received a Webby Official Honouree for Food & Drink the same year. As of February 2023, the channel currently has over 9.72 million subscribers.

History 

The YouTube channel was created by Sonbuchner on September 23, 2010 with the first episode being uploaded on December 14, 2015. Since its inception, the channel has explored many different cuisines from around the world, from India to Cuba. In 2019, Best Ever Food Review Show (BEFRS) became the first US-owned YouTube channel to receive filming access in Iran.

The Host 
  
William Sonbuchner (Sonny) was born in St. Cloud, Minnesota on August 22nd, 1984. In his early years, Sonny attended Sauk Rapids-Rice High School. At the age of 24, he moved to South Korea to pursue a career in teaching where he also started to learn film production.

References 
Sonny side full information

YouTube channels